Catocala ellamajor is a moth in the family Erebidae. It is found in China (Sichuan).

References

ellamajor
Moths described in 2010
Moths of Asia